Ibrahim Bek (1889 – 31 August 1931) was a leader of the Basmachi movement. He was a member of the Uzbek Lakai tribe in Eastern Bukhara and led an organized resistance against the Soviet military in the early 1920s. 

A religious conservative and loyal to the ousted Emir of Bukhara he had little dealings with "reformist" basmachi who had jadids in their ranks. He actively fought against Enver Pasha during his brief time in Central Asia. Despite being a good guerrilla leader, Ibrahim was essentially a relic of an older time and was to find his increasingly sophisticated military tactics out of step with the political nature of the Russian Civil War.

Bek and his Basmachi were engaged and defeated by Red Army units of the Turkestan Military District under the command of Mikhail Frunze in the spring of 1925. The Soviets asserted that Bek had been provided assistance by British intelligence services.

Bek was eventually forced to flee south into Afghanistan, from where he along with Fazail Maksum led several cross-border raids back into the newly organized Soviet Socialist Republic of Tajikistan. Bek was subsequently turned in to Soviet authorities by Tajik villagers, and eventually executed in 1931. By mid-1931, the Basmachi had been largely defeated by the Red Army.

References

Further reading 
 Gusterin, Pavel, История Ибрагим-бека. Басмачество одного курбаши с его слов. — Саарбрюккен: LAP LAMBERT Academic Publishing, 2014. — 60 с. — .

1931 deaths
Basmachi movement
Uzbek revolutionaries
People executed by the Soviet Union
Executed revolutionaries
1889 births